Alyson Eastman is an American politician. She served as member of the Vermont House of Representatives, representing the Addison-Rutland District from 2015 to 2017.

See also
Politics of Vermont

References

Members of the Vermont House of Representatives
Living people
Place of birth missing (living people)
Year of birth missing (living people)
Champlain College alumni
Vermont Independents